Lucena Club de Fútbol, S.A.D. was a Spanish football team based in Lucena, Córdoba, in the autonomous community of Andalusia. Founded in 1968, it was dissolved in 2015.

History
Lucena Club de Fútbol was founded in 1968. It was originally named Atlético Lucentino Industrial Club de Fútbol, receiving its current name in 2006.

In little more than a year of management by Eduardo Bouzón and Javier Martí, who admitted the friendship with the president of Córdoba, Carlos González, Lucena CF fell dramatically without demonstrating its economic, sports and planning abilities.

On 29 December 2015, the club resigned to continue playing in the 2015–16 edition of the Tercera División championship. The poor economic management forced the coaching staff and the president to leave the club. The club did not issue any statement and simply sent its withdrawal documents to the Andalusian Federation.

Club names
Atlético Lucentino Industrial - (1968–2006)
Lucena Club de Fútbol - (2006–2015)

Season to season
As Atlético Lucentino Industrial

As Lucena Club de Fútbol

8 seasons in Segunda División B
18 seasons in Tercera División

References

External links
Official website 
Exclusive Lucena Cf website 
Futbolme team profile 

1968 establishments in Andalusia
2015 disestablishments in Andalusia
Association football clubs established in 1968
Association football clubs disestablished in 2015
Football clubs in Andalusia
Province of Córdoba (Spain)